COTSBot is a small intelligent underwater craft  long, which is designed by Queensland University of Technology (QUT) to kill the very destructive crown of thorns starfish in the Great Barrier Reef off the north-east coast of Australia. It identifies its target using an image-analyzing neural net to analyze what an onboard camera sees, and then lethal-injects the starfish with bile salts or similar using a needle on the end of a long underslung foldable arm.

It uses GPS to navigate. The first version was created in the early 2000s with an accuracy rate of about 65%. After training COTSBot with machine learning its accuracy rate rose to 99% by 2019.

COTSBot is capable of killing 200 crown of thorns starfish with its two liters capacity of poison. COTSBot is capable of performing about 20 runs per day, but multiple COTSBots will be necessary to significantly impact the crown of thorns starfish populations.

A smaller version of COTSBot called "RangerBot" is also being developed by QUT.

References

External links
Google search for images
https://wiki.qut.edu.au/download/attachments/192519759/COTSBot_V2_Poster.png?version=1&modificationDate=1441116020000&api=v2
image
http://robotglobe.org/cotsbot-to-protect-great-barrier-reef-from-invading-starfish/cotsbot2/
https://www.youtube.com/watch?v=L-cAwubAfSU
https://www.youtube.com/watch?v=RS3EpYfeJAk
image of the robot

Robotic submarines
Pest control